Velashjerd (also Romanized as Velāshjerd and Valāshjerd; also known as Bīlāskīrt, Valāsjerd, Valāzjerd, and Walashgird) is a village in Farmahin Rural District, in the Central District of Farahan County, Markazi Province, Iran. At the 2006 census, its population was 92, in 29 families.

References 

Populated places in Farahan County